Carlie Kotyza-Witthuhn (born 1986/1987) is an American politician serving in the Minnesota House of Representatives since 2019. A member of the Minnesota Democratic–Farmer–Labor Party (DFL), Kotyza-Witthuhn represents District 49B in the southwestern Twin Cities metropolitan area, which includes the city of Eden Prairie and parts of Hennepin County, Minnesota.

Early life, education, and career
Kotyza-Witthuhn attended the University of St. Thomas, graduating with a Bachelor of Arts in entrepreneurship. She is an operations analyst.

Minnesota House of Representatives
Kotyza-Witthuhn was elected to the Minnesota House of Representatives in 2018, defeating Republican incumbent Jenifer Loon, and has been reelected every two years since. Kotyza-Witthuhn serves as vice-chair of the Commerce Finance and Policy Committee, and sits on the Children and Families Finance and Policy, Economic Development Finance and Policy, and Human Services Finance Committees.

Electoral history

Personal life
Kotyza-Witthuhn and her husband, Rory, have three children. They reside in Eden Prairie, Minnesota, and attend St. Stephen's Episcopal Church in Edina.

References

External links

 Official House of Representatives website
 Official campaign website

1980s births
Living people
People from Eden Prairie, Minnesota
University of St. Thomas (Minnesota) alumni
Democratic Party members of the Minnesota House of Representatives
21st-century American politicians
21st-century American women politicians
Women state legislators in Minnesota